Sewickley can refer to a location in the United States:

Sewickley, Pennsylvania, a borough
Sewickley Academy, a private secondary school
Sewickley Bridge, a bridge over the Ohio River
Sewickley Heights, Pennsylvania
Sewickley Hills, Pennsylvania
Sewickley Township, Westmoreland County, Pennsylvania
New Sewickley Township, Beaver County, Pennsylvania
North Sewickley Township, Beaver County, Pennsylvania